The Duke Ellington Songbook, Vol. 2 is a 1979 album  by Sarah Vaughan, focusing on the works of Duke Ellington.

Track listing 
 "I Ain't Got Nothin' But the Blues" (Duke Ellington, Don George)  - 4:36
 "Black Butterfly" (Ellington, Irving Mills)  - 3:03
 "Chelsea Bridge" (Billy Strayhorn)  - 3:26
 "What Am I Here For?" (Ellington, Frankie Laine)  - 3:34
 "Tonight I Shall Sleep (With a Smile on My Face)" (Ellington, Mack Gordon)  - 3:59
 "Rocks in My Bed" (Ellington)  - 5:22
 "I Got It Bad (and That Ain't Good)" (Ellington, Paul Francis Webster)  - 4:31
 "Everything But You" (Ellington, George, Harry James)  - 5:29
 "Mood Indigo" (Barney Bigard, Ellington, Mills)  - 5:04
 "It Don't Mean a Thing (If It Ain't Got That Swing)" (Ellington, Mills)  - 2:29
 "Prelude to a Kiss" (Ellington, Gordon, Mills) - 5:58

References

Pablo Records albums
Sarah Vaughan albums
1979 albums
Albums produced by Norman Granz
Duke Ellington tribute albums